Kurata (written:  or ) is a Japanese surname. Notable people with the surname include:

 Hideyuki Kurata, writer
 Hyakuzō Kurata, writer
, Japanese rower
  Kogoro Kurata, designer of the Kuratas mecha
 Masayo Kurata, voice actor
 Satoru Kurata (1922–1978), botanist
 Seiji Kurata, photographer
 Shigeo Kurata, botanist
 Shirley Kurata, Japanese American wardrobe stylist and costume designer
 Shu Kurata, footballer
, Japanese handball player
 Tetsuo Kurata, actor
 Yasuaki Kurata, actor known as David Kurata

Fictional characters 
 Akihiro Kurata, a character in the anime series Digimon Data Squad
 Atsushi Kurata, a character in the manga series Hikaru no Go
Yui Kurata, a character in the manga series Trinity Seven
 Sana Kurata, a character in the manga series Kodomo no Omocha
 Sayuri Kurata, character in the visual novel Kanon
 Mashiro Kurata, a character in the rhythm game BanG Dream!

Japanese-language surnames